Levi Seacer Jr. (born April 30, 1961) is an American musician.  He was an early associate of Sheila E. when he was tapped by Prince to form a new touring band after the demise of The Revolution in 1986.  Seacer became the band's bassist, as well as a backing vocalist.  Later, he began collaborating with Prince as a songwriter on several projects.  Seacer was a founding member of Prince's The New Power Generation in 1991, switching from bass to the band's guitarist.  He remained a member of the band until 1993, and also participated in the later version of Madhouse.  After leaving the Prince camp in 1993, Seacer has worked as a producer and session musician on various projects, most notably the gospel music ensemble Sounds of Blackness.

In 1990, he produced the majority of Right Rhythm, a Motown-issued album recorded by the pop/R&B group The Pointer Sisters. In 1991, he performed various instruments on the album Moment of Truth by Terri Nunn.

In October 1998, Seacer (along with Tony M.) filed a lawsuit against Prince, claiming that Prince hadn't shared royalties that Levi and Tony were owed for songs they had co-written for Prince's NPG Publishing, including "Sexy MF" and "My Name Is Prince". In the end, Mosely and Seacer settled for approximately $40,000 each (apparently, not even enough to pay their legal expenses), having sued Prince for $800,000.

References

African-American guitarists
African-American rock musicians
American funk bass guitarists
American male bass guitarists
American funk guitarists
Rhythm guitarists
American rhythm and blues guitarists
American rhythm and blues bass guitarists
American soul guitarists
American male guitarists
New Power Generation members
Musicians from Richmond, California
Living people
Guitarists from California
1961 births